Bharat Gupt is an Indian classicist, theatre theorist, sitar and surbahar player, musicologist, and newspaper columnist. He is also a retired Professor in English, who taught at the College of Vocational Studies of the University of Delhi. In February 2023 he received the Sangeet Natak Akademi Award by the President of India for his contribution to musicology.

Life and studies
Bharat Gupt was born on 28 November 1946 in Moradabad (Uttar Pradesh, India), a small city of mixed Hindu-Muslim population, known for Hindustani music and Urdu poetry.  His parents moved in the early '50s to Delhi where he went to school and college and studied English, Hindi, Sanskrit and philosophy, spending, however, every summer in the district town. He then spent a year in the US at the end of Counter-Cultural days, in the late 1960s; then he moved to Canada and took a master's degree from Toronto. Back in India, he learnt to play the sitar and surbahar, training for eight years under the eminent musician Pandit Uma Shankar Mishra. He also studied ancient Indian musicological texts and modern Indian Music, yoga sutras and classics under Acharya K.C. Brihaspati and Swami Kripalvananda.

Trained both in modern European and traditional Indian educational systems, he has worked in classical studies, theatre, music, culture and media studies and researched as Senior Fellow of the Onassis Foundation in Greece on revival of ancient Greek theatre.

In his own words:
As a classicist I came to realise that ancient Greek drama and culture as a whole, was given an unduly empirical color by the modern West. Looking at things from my own location I saw that Greek theatre was closer to ancient Indian theatre as an ethical and religious act or hieropraxis. Instead of being seen as Western and Eastern, Greek and Indian theatres should be seen rooted in the Indo-European cultural beliefs, myths and idolatory and the aesthetics of emotional arousal.

In 1995–1996 senior research fellow invited by the Alexander S. Onassis Public Benefit Foundation, Greece, for six months to research on Modern Greek Theatre Productions of Ancient Greek Plays. In 1995 he was also a member of the Jury for the International Onasis Prize for Drama (1995)

He speaks Sanskrit, Hindi, English and Greek.

He retired as associate professor of English at College of Vocational Studies, University of Delhi and is on visiting faculty at the National School of Drama, Delhi. From 1995 to this day (2010) he has made numerous and extensive lecture tours, speaking on theatre and music at various universities in India, North America and Greece, a country he loves deeply and visits at least once a year. He has also directed major lectures and directed seminars. As part of his research material he has made about 2000 photographs of amphitheaters and antiquities all over Greece as well as in Syracuse, Italy.

He writes for research journals and national newspapers on cultural and educational issues.  As a reviewer, he is a frequent contributor to Journal of Sangeet Natak Academy, Journal of Music Academy Madras, Indian Musicological Society, Baroda.

His practical involvement with traditional Indian temple architecture resulted in initiating the construction of the Ram Mandir in Ashok Vihar (Delhi) it's a "nagar style" stone temple with carvings which will give Delhi a traditional temple after a millennium. In 2001, he was one of the founding members of the International Forum for India's heritage: a non-religious, non-ideological, apolitical body, IFIH is a network of scholars, educationists, artists, scientists, social workers, environmentalists, thinkers and writers, who have come together to promote India's cultural heritage.

In 1976, he married Yukti, and the couple had two sons: Abhinav and Udayan. In August 2010 he became the grandfather of a boy named Atharva, after the 4th Veda.
He retired from the University of Delhi in Nov.2011 but continues to lecture at other forums.

Writings and ideas
Much of his writing is devoted to classical Indian and classical Greek drama, comparing their similarities and differences and exploring the possibilities of common Indo-European origins.
His first book, Dramatic Concepts – Greek and Indian (first published in 1994, reprinted in 1996 and in 2006), was directly inspired by his Greek travels and studies. This study offers a fresh approach in comparing ancient Greek and Indian dramatic theories. Instead of treating the Poetics and the Natyashastra as Western and Eastern viewpoints, it places them within the broad framework of ancient Indo-European culture and the art of sacred drama (hieropraxis). It demonstrates that hieropraxis was basically different from post-Renaissance European drama which was entirely secular in content and Realistic in presentation. The Poetics and the Natyashastra on the contrary, belonged to theatres which pleased both gods and men, and which used semiotised gesture, dance, music, and dialogue to create a highly ornate theatrical reality. The book aims at comparing not only the concepts as propounded by Aristotle and Bharata Muni, but also attempts to reconstruct the Greek and Indian performances to highlight their similarities and differences. Concepts like anukarana, dharmi, abhinaya, itivritta, mimesis, muthos, melopoiia, katharsis and rasa, etc., as revisited and expounded here, can be seen as means of creating dramatic shows which go beyond message and entertainment to provide sublimer experiences.
An excerpt from a review by David L. Gitomer: 
"Although it is rare to find a comparative treatment of Greek and Sanskrit drama as thoughtful and passionate as this one, students of classical Indian theater will recognize a familiar topic in the title. (...) Gupt asserts that examining genres cross-culturally "can only lead to dead ends" because literary genres are culturally and historically unique; instead, "a comparison of performance modes is likely to be more illuminative." (...) One of the book's strengths is the detailed comparative description of the ritual roots of theater in the Indo-European cultures of ancient Greece and India (...) All in all, this work does represent the most thorough study in this particular critical genre, and if Gupt's engaging idiosyncrasies can be acknowledged, the book will succeed in fostering an appreciation of Sanskrit literature for those who commit to reading the texts he discusses, even in translation."
DAVID L. GITOMER, Comparative Drama, Kalamazoo. Fall 1997

And excerpts from another review, by Richard Schechner, TDR
Gupt argues that rasa, the "juice" or "essence" of the theatrical-aesthetic pleasure experience, is comparable to katharsis: Katharsis should not be viewed as mere relief, it could better be regarded as restoration to a state of pleasure not generally experienced [while] the process of rasa emergence requires the removal of obstructions [ ... ]. Katharsis and rasa, with their separate points of emphasis, both begin with purification and end in delight. 272-73 This is an insight not previously proposed by anyone, a definite advance in performance theory. However much his book has been about ancient practices and theories, Gupt concludes his study looking forward: The vision of ancient hieropraxis which represents a balance of various media of theatrical communication, can be extremely useful. The harmonious use of the visual gestural, symbolic, and kinetic and the aural spoken, sung, and musical as achieved in ancient drama, and as exemplified in the dramatic theories of Greece and India, has many a lesson for the present day world theatre. The lesson, according to Gupt, is to suggest a codified alternative "which can be offered as a stable and distinct alternative to commercial realism" which continues to dominate modern theatre, both in the West and India. 
Gupt's book is important, examining in depth questions often raised but rarely pursued. Frequently, those making "comparative studies" are more knowledgeable about one side or the other. Radical assertions concerning "Indo-European" or "Eurasian" theatre are in the air but rarely brought down to the scholarly earth. Gupt knows both the Indian and the Greek ancient theatre; his book is full of details, provocative in the best sense, theoretical without losing touch with concrete data, and despite the difficulty of its subject, easy to read. "Dramatic Concepts Greek and Indian" ought to be an assigned text( ... )for courses, some existing, most waiting to be taught, comparing ancient Indian and Greek theatres and performance theories." 
Schechner, Richard, TDR, Cambridge, Mass. v41, n2 Summer,1997 :153

Then followed the translation of the 28th chapter of the Natyashastra, devoted to the musical scales. This translation (saanvaya) of the text includes the translation of the Sanskrit commentary of Achaarya KCD Brihaspati, a leading musicologist of modern times and Gupt's teacher, who presents an original interpretation of the sloka, although he often makes reference to earlier contributions of the sage Abhinavagupta.

An excerpt from the introduction: "( ... ) it is sometimes argued that (the Natyasastra) presents a music meant for theatre and not for the independent art ( ... ). This controversy is a creation of the post-industrial era in India, when as in the West, the relationship of music with poetry, dance, painting and sculpture was ruptured. Such issues, however, have been raised in the world of Indian music only. In literary studies, with a better formal tradition of critical training, nobody has ever raised the question whether the metres (chandas) given in the two chapters (15 and 16) of the Natyasastra are meant for theatrical employment or for literary use ... ( ... ) The twenty-eighth chapter of the Natyasastra limits itself to the employment of notes or svaras in music. It begins with an announcement, 'I shall now enunciate the rules relating to the playing of instruments' ( ... ). But we are soon told that the human body is also an instrument, thus covering vocal music in the ambit of atodyavidhi.( ... ) For the ancients, pada or song was the beginning of music, strings were the middle and drumming was the end. Music as merely notes and rhythm, svara and tala, was inconceivable. The instruments emulated the human voice and the drums followed its rhythmic statement. This pattern obtains even now in Indian music. The post-Renaissance European concept of music as instrumental tonal orchestration has deprivileged the verbal composition, as a result of which, there is a revision in the concept of music even in traditional societies."

In his review of the book, Wayne Howard writes:
"(..) this is a book that greatly advances our understanding of ancient Indian music. It should be part of the library of any music theorist or musicologist with an interest in the historical development of gandharva, the term used by the NS for the musical art. Because of its combination of the original text with a translation and a new commentary (albeit a modern one), and due to its generally lucid treatment of the subject matter, the book has definite advantages over its predecessors. Bharat Gupt is to be congratulated for bringing out this ancient masterpiece in a publication that is both readable and highly informative."

"India – A Culture Decline Or Revival?", a book published in 2008, critically analyses the state of affairs in India after the British left in 1947 and examines whether Independence has ushered an era of cultural and social freedom or a cultural decline has set in – a thought-provoking subject. It is often taken for granted that Independence from the British rule also ushered an era of cultural and social freedom in India. The author wishes to examine if that is true or if a cultural decline set in soon after. Based on a verse in the Pancatantra, the book has been divided into six parts: Eka (person), Kula (family), Grama (habitat), Janapada (land), Prithvi (earth) and Atma. Issues of education; conflicts between the classes, regions, jatis, languages and religions; expansion of proselytizers; lack of governance; tensions between the legislators and judiciary; rise of unbridled consumerism; falling standards of democracy; dilemmas created by notions of dharma challenged by Westernized modernity; and the problems of attaining universal harmony, are all put into a perspective under these six categories. While examining the state of affairs the author also suggests a way for the pursuit of happiness through unselfish transcendence.

An excerpt from the preface of the book:
"It is further imagined that in spite of its poverty, India is admired by the richer nations of the West as a culturally evolved nation. This self-congratulation, lingering from the euphoric days of our freedom struggle, sounds now like the thunder on distant mountains shedding not a glimmer of hope on our present lives. For most of us our memory is enough to be a lived-through account of the cultural decline that set in barely within a decade after freedom. Any analysis is sufficient to counter the smug belief, still fostered in schools and political speeches about the superiority of our culture, once voiced in Iqbal"s song, "Saare Jahaan se acchaa Hindustan hamaaraa". Very insidiously this rhyme nurses a misplaced conviction that while many other ancient civilizations were wiped out in time, India alone is indestructible ... The song takes special pride in stating that while the Greek and Roman civilizations, the so-called predecessors of the West, lost to ravages of time, Indian civilization alone remains immortal".

Bharat Gupt is a vocal activist for the revival of Indian Heritage and its comeback in the educational system.
The following is an excerpt from his polemic article "Who is afraid of Sanscrit?": 
India alone excels in belittling its classical heritage as it has unfortunately codified it as its "Hindu past". This classification began in the colonial period when non-European cultures were primarily seen in religious denominations as non-Christian coloured races further divided into two broad categories, primitives or static cultures. Within the western world these approaches were countered first by Orientalists and later by Modernists, both opponents of Newtonian rationalism. But while the Orientalist contributed to the discovery of the East by the West, they also succeeded in creating a somnambulist reassurance in the minds of many Indians who never tire of revelling in praises of India by Schopenhauer, Max Muller, Blavatsky, Whitman and the like. In spite of the Orientalists, administrators like Macaulay forged for India an education system which had little or marginal place, not only for Sanskrit literature, but for all the traditional arts and sciences like music, poetry, dance, theatre and painting, Ayurveda, Rasayan, Jyotisha, metrics, etc. This dichotomy continued well into the semi-century of independence and flourishes strong as ever.

In the book Globalization & identity: cultural diversity, religion, and citizenship by Majid Teranian & B. Jeannie Lum (editors), where Gupt contributed the essay "Religious plurality in education", passionately arguing that religious – multi-religious- education should come back to schools, in order to promote understanding of other faiths. The editors note, in the introduction: "Gupt provides several recommendations for the transformation of India's school system in teaching the Heritage Curriculum as Heritage Activity that incorporates many of the activity-based modes of instruction we associate with progressive education."

Passion 
Bharat Gupt's passion is writing on diverse topics. Playing the surbahār and travelling to villages and tīrthas.

Books

Already published
Dramatic Concepts Greek and Indian (1994)
Natyashastra, Chapter 28: Ancient Scales of Indian Music (1996) [translation into English],
Literary Criticism and Theory (Greek), Twelve Greek Poems into Hindi Indira Gandhi National Open University, Delhi (2001)
India: A Cultural Decline or Revival? (2008)

Published articles
"The Technique of Allusion in the Poetry of T. S. Eliot." In Student's Handbook in American Literature. Ed. C. D. Narsimhaiah. Ludhiana Kalyani, 1972. 188–97.
"Laxmi Narain Lal ka Abdulla Dewaana (in Hindi)." In Natak Aur Rang Manch. Ed. I. Madan. Delhi: Lipi Prakashan, 1975. 95–100.
"Ravishena krita Padma Purana main Sangit Carca (in Hindi)." In Sangeet (monthly). Sangeet Karyalaya, Hathras. May 1981. 15–16.
"Sangit ko Acharya Brihaspati ki den (in Hindi)." In Sangeet (monthly). Sangeet Karyalaya, Hathras. 6 articles. July–December, 1981.
"Origin of Dhruvapada." In Sangeet Nataka, Journal of Sangeet Natak Academy. New Delhi.
"Music in the Natyasastra." In Journal of the Music Academy, Madras. 56 (1985), 165–75; 57 (1986), 172–81; 58 (1987), 91–109; 59 (1988) 57–82; 60 (1989).
"Valmiki's Ramayana and the Natyasastra." In Sangeet Natak. 81-82 (July-Dec. 1986) 63–76.
"The Date of Natyasastra."  Journal of the Oriental Institute of Baroda 36. 1-4 (Sept. 86-June 87) 69–86.
"Use of the Dhruva Songs in Ancient Indian Theatre."  Journal of the Oriental Institute of Baroda 37 (March–June 1988) 305–20.
"Classifications on Lokadharmi and Natyadharmi."  Sangeet Natak 95. (Jan.-March 1990) 35–44.
"Peace as Theatrical Experience." In Manascarya, Journal of Cultural Studies, North Eastern Hill University, Shillong, VOL. II, No. 2&3, 1996, pp 64–9
"What is Ethnic." The Eastern Anthropologist, 50: 2. 1997, pp 139– 46.
"Religious Plurality in Education." Globalization and Identity. Editors, Majid Tehraninan and B. Jeannie Lum. Transaction Publishers, UK/US. 2006, pp 55–62.
"Laughter and Tears in Classical Indian Theater: Its Theoretical Frame" Dioniso, Indtituto Nazionale del Dramma Antico. DIONYSOS 2007, number 6, Journal of National Institute of Ancient Drama, Italy. pp 338–41.
"Classical Indian Art Theory and its Present Day Worth"  Shruti, Delhi, Vol 2, April 2008, pp 58–71
Newspaper Articles
"Affinity between Theatres: Comparisons, Parallels, and Common Elements between the Two Performing Traditions." KATHEMERINI, ATHENS, Weekly Supplement, Sunday, 29 December 1996.. translated into Greek as "Συγγένειες στο θέατρο: συγκρίσεις, παραλληλίες και κοινά στοιχεία στις δύο θεατρικές παραδόσεις" Καθημερινή, Επτά Ημέρες, Κυριακή 29 Δεκεμβρίου.
"A Requiem for Toilers in Foreign Lands." Times of India, Edit page, 4-2-97
"West Versus the Rest is the New Cold War Rhetoric."Times of India, Edit page, 23-4-97
"Reinstate Art in Modern Education." Times of India, Edit page, 20-6-97
"Of High Flying Swamis and Sensual Sanyasis" Times of India, Edit page, 22-9-97
"When Amphitheatres come to Life, Ancient Greek Theatre in Modern Times" Pioneer, Delhi, Art Page (FULL), 26-6-97
"Committee Sans Commitment" Pioneer, (Second Opinion), 11-7-97
"Real Estates False Premises" Pioneer, (Second Opinion), 31 July 1997
"Castigate Divide not Jain Report" Pioneer, (Second Opinion), 10 December 1897
"The Great White Hope" Pioneer, (Second Opinion), 20 January 1998
"Greece and India: Evolving Ties" Pioneer, World Report, page 8, 24 January 1998
"This is not the Secularism We had Opted For" Pioneer, (Second Opinion), 27 March 1998
"Their Only Clue is License Plate" Pioneer, (Second Opinion), 13 April 1998
"Age -Related Problem " Pioneer, (Second Opinion), 26 May 1998
"The Frigid Face of a Language", Pioneer (Second Opinion), 8 June 1998
"Shadow Boxing on Ayodhya", Pioneer (Second Opinion), 19 June 1998
"Politics of Compensation, Mandal, Mandir and Women's Bill" Indian Express, Edit Page, 2 July 1997.
"Bring Back the Teacher, Freeing Higher Education." Indian Express, Edit Page, 6 August 1997.
"Institutionalized Medievalism, Entrenchment of Caste" Indian Express, Edit Page, 9 September 1997.
"A National Crisis of Faith, After Five Decades of Regression." Indian Express, Edit Page, 18 December 1997.
"Oh for a Whiff of Fresh Air, National Suffocation and Senility" Indian Express, Edit Page, 13 January 1998.
"Lame Duck Legislators: Dangers of Vote Bank Politics" Indian Express, Edit Page, 9 February 1998.
"Dangers of Tokenism : A Bellicose Return" Indian Express, Edit Page, 13 March 1998
"Who's Afraid of Sanskrit : Living Outside Heritage " Indian Express, Edit Page, 20 November 1998
"Interfaith Tolerance is not the only Issue : The Pluralism of Dilettantes" Indian Express, Edit Page 9 February 1999
"Ethnicity, a Ploy to Create Puppet Nations" ASIAN AGE, 18 May 1999
"Sonia Gandhi: Return of the Native " ASIAN AGE, 3 June 1999

Major public lectures on Natyashastra

At Madras University
 9–13 March 2009 expounding on Sanskrit text and Abhinavabharati (25 hours) and the same at Kalakshetra, Chennai(Madras) February 2012.

At Triveni Kala Sangam, New Delhi
 8–13 May 2009 expounding on Sanskrit text and Abhinavabharati (10 hours).

AT KALAKSHETRA CHENNAI
1. 6-10 Feb 2012, expounding on Sanskrit text and Abhinavabharati (25 hours)

Major seminars directed
  "Philosophy of Indian Drama", India International Centre, Delhi.  6–8 April. 2002 sponsored by ICPR.
 "Philosophy of Indian Music". At India International Centre Delhi 7-9 Feb. 2003 Sponsored by ICPR
 "Arts and Culture for Indian Resurgence", at India International Centre, Delhi sponsored by IIC and Kalaikoodam Center of Arts. 1–3 August 2008

Notes

External links

1946 births
Indian classical scholars
Indian Sanskrit scholars
Indian musicologists
Hindustani instrumentalists
20th-century Indian translators
Living people
Academic staff of Delhi University
Delhi University alumni
University of Toronto alumni
Maharaja Sayajirao University of Baroda alumni
Recipients of the Sangeet Natak Akademi Fellowship